The Hugo Scouts were a minor league baseball team based in Hugo, Oklahoma in 1914. Preceded by the 1913 Hugo Hugoites, Hugo teams played exclusively as members of the Class D level Texas-Oklahoma League, hosting home games at Ansley Park.

At age 18, Baseball Hall of Fame member Rogers Hornsby played for the 1914 Hugo Scouts in his first professional season.

History
Professional baseball began in Hugo, Oklahoma in the middle of the 1913 season. The Hogo Hugoites began play in the eight–team Class D level Texas-Oklahoma League. On July 7, 1913, the Wichita Falls Drillers franchise relocated to Hugo, Oklahoma. Hugo joined the Ardmore Giants, Bonham Blues, Denison Blue Sox, Durant Choctaws, Paris Boosters, Sherman Lions and Texarkana Tigers in league play.

The Wichita Falls Drillers had a 33–46 record when the franchise relocated to Hugo on July 7, 1913. The team compiled a 21–21 record while based in Hugo and finished with an overall record of 54–70. The Wichita/Hugo team placed 6th in the Texas–Oklahoma League, playing under Manager Fred Morris. The Hugoites finished 29.5 games behind the 1st place Denison Blue Sox in the final standings. Wichita/Hugo player Fred Nicholson led the league with both 90 runs scored and 147 hits.

The team became known as the Hugo "Scouts" in 1914, as the franchise continued play as members of the Texas–Oklahoma League, before folding during the season. On June 11, 1914, the Hugo Scouts had compiled a 19–32 record playing under managers Lon Ury and Leo Nevitt when the franchise disbanded. The Ardmore Indians franchise disbanded on the same day. The Texas–Oklahoma League folded permanently after the 1914 season.

At age 18, Baseball Hall of Fame member Rogers Hornsby played for the 1914 Hugo Scouts. Hornsby reportedly signed with the Scouts for $75.00 per month and hit .232 with 45 errors for the season.

Hugo, Oklahoma has not hosted another minor league team.

The ballpark
The Hugo minor league teams played minor league home games at Ansley Park. The park is still in use as a public park. Ansley Park is located at North Broadway & East Lloyd Street, Hugo, Oklahoma.

Timeline

Year–by–year records

Notable alumni

Baseball Hall of Fame alumni
Rogers Hornsby (1914) Inducted, 1942

Notable alumni
Bill Brown (1913–1914)
Harry Kane (1913)
Rollie Naylor (1913)
Fred Nicholson (1913–1914)
Jim Scoggins (1913)
Lon Ury (1914, MGR)

See also
Hugo Scouts playersHugo Hugoites players

References

External links
Baseball Reference

Defunct baseball teams in Texas
Baseball teams established in 1914
Baseball teams disestablished in 1914
Choctaw County, Oklahoma
Texas–Oklahoma League teams